The Clarkson–St. Lawrence men's ice hockey rivalry is a college ice hockey rivalry between the Clarkson Golden Knights men's ice hockey and St. Lawrence Saints men's ice hockey programs. The first meeting between the two occurred on February 13, 1926, the first game in the history of St. Lawrence's program.

History
Clarkson was one of the bevy of teams who began their ice hockey program shortly after the end of World War I. Five years later, St. Lawrence founded its program and, with less than 10 miles separating the two campuses, they swiftly became rivals. They played one another at least once a year until warm weather and the great depression forced the Larries to suspend operations. The rivalry was eventually renewed in 1941 but World War II caused a second interruption in the series. In 1950 both schools were founding members of the Tri-State League, the first official conference for NCAA ice hockey. They remained in the league for over a decade until all three remaining teams were absorbed during the formation of ECAC Hockey in 1961. Being in the same conference for several decades has led to both teams playing one another on a consistent basis as well as common but infrequent postseason meetings.

From 1970 through 1982, Clarkson and St. Lawrence jointly held the North Country Thanksgiving Festival, an in-season tournament.

Game results
Full game results for the rivalry, with rankings beginning in the 1998–99 season.

Series facts

References

External links
 Clarkson Golden Knights men's ice hockey
 St. Lawrence Saints men's ice hockey

College ice hockey rivalries in the United States
ECAC Hockey
Clarkson Golden Knights men's ice hockey
St. Lawrence Saints men's ice hockey
1926 establishments in New York (state)